The Peace Society, International Peace Society or London Peace Society, originally known as the Society for the Promotion of Permanent and Universal Peace, was a pioneering British pacifist organisation that was active from 1816 until the 1930s.

History

Foundation
The Society for the Promotion of Permanent and Universal Peace was founded after a meeting at the premises of William Allen, in Plough Court, Lombard Street in the City of London on 14 June 1816. Following the Battle of Waterloo the previous year and the decades of European conflict with Napoleon Bonaparte, it advocated a gradual, proportionate, and simultaneous disarmament of all nations and the principle of arbitration. Many of the founders came together under the banner of Christian abolitionism and a number were Quakers.

The society in London helped establish auxiliary societies in various cities and towns across the United Kingdom; for instance at Doncaster and Leeds, Swansea and Neath, Newcastle, Birmingham, Liverpool, Bath, Bristol, Coventry, Exeter, Darlington, Leicester, Hull, Plymouth and Southampton; to name but a few. It published a monthly journal, The Herald of Peace, which was first printed in 1819.

On 25 May 1836 the society held their twentieth anniversary meeting at the Exeter Hall on London's Strand. In 1843 they hosted the first International Peace Congress.

Between 1817 and 1833 the society issued twelve tracts for its membership, which ran to multiple editions:

I. Anon. (Noah Worcester), A Solemn Review of the Custom of War; Showing that War is the Effect of Popular Delusion, and Proposing a Remedy (1817)
II. John Scott, War Inconsistent with the Doctrine and Example of Jesus Christ. In a Letter to a Friend (1817); originally published in 1796
III. Thomas Clarkson, An Essay on the Doctrines and Practice of the Early Christians, as they Relate to War. Addressed to Those who Profess to have Regard for the Christian Name (1817)
IV. Erasmus, Extracts from the Writings of Erasmus on the Subject of War (1817)
V. Evan Rees, Sketches of the Horrors of War, Chiefly Selected from Labaume's narrative of the Campaign in Russia in 1812 (1818)
VI. David Bogue, On Universal Peace; Being Extracts from a Discourse Delivered in October 1813 (1819)
VII. Jonathan Dymond, Observations on the Applicability of the Pacific Principles of the New Testament to the Conduct of States, and on the Limitation which Those Principles Impose on the Rights of Self-defence (1825)
VIII. Anon., An Examination of the Principles which are Considered to Support the Practice of War. By a Lady (1825)
IX. Thomas Hancock, The Principles of Peace, Exemplified in the Conduct of the Society of Friends in Ireland, during the Rebellion of 1798. In three parts (1825)
X. Anon., Historical Illustrations of the Origin and Consequences of War (By the Author of Tract VIII) (1831)
XI. M. Necker, Reflections on the Calamities of War, and the Superior Policy of Peace. Translated from the French (1831)
XII. Joseph John Gurney, An Essay on War, and on its Lawfulness under the Christian Dispensation (1833)

Late 19th century
Lewis Appleton organized the International Arbitration and Peace Association (IAPA) in 1880.
Unlike the Peace Society the IAPA accepted defensive war, was not restricted to Christians and claimed to be international. It also allowed women on the executive committee.

In the spring of 1882, E. M. Southey, the main founder of the Ladies Peace Association, persuaded her group to disaffiliate from the Peace Society and join the IAPA. The Quaker Priscilla Hannah Peckover played a central role in organizing a new ladies auxiliary of the Peace Society that was launched on 12 July 1882. During the 1880s the Peace Society stagnated. Its Ladies' Peace Association was more dynamic, and claimed 9,217 members by the summer of 1885, of which 4,000 belonged to Peckover's Wisbech group.

Early 20th century
The society's failure to condemn the outbreak of the First World War in 1914 resulted in internal divisions and led to the resignation of its leader, Rev. William Evans Darby. His successor, Rev. Herbert Dunnico, led the society's unsuccessful campaign for peace 
negotiations.

In 1930 the Peace Society merged with the International Christian Peace Fellowship and was renamed the International Peace Society.  At sometime thereafter, with the Second World War looming and growing public unease towards British government policies of appeasement, it became defunct.

Members

Founder members
As listed in The Origins of War Prevention by Martin Ceadel, the founding dozen in 1816 were:
William Allen (1770–1843) - Quaker, philanthropist, chemist
John Clarkson (1764–1828) - Abolitionist, founding father of Sierra Leone, brother of Thomas Clarkson
Thomas Clarkson (1760–1846) - Abolitionist and campaigner, brother of John Clarkson, author of the society's third tract
William Crawford (1788–1847) - Philanthropist and prison reformer (see WikiSource)
Charles Stokes Dudley (1780–1862) - Born to a Quaker family, active in the British and Foreign Bible Society
Rev. Thomas Harper (1762–1832) - Clergyman based in Walworth, author of the society's ninth tract (see obit The Herald of Peace 1831, p. 528)
Robert Marsden (1769/70–1847) - Evangelical, stockbroker, the society's first chairman
Joseph Tregelles Price (1784–1854) - Quaker, family owned the Neath Abbey ironworks (see SAS)
Evan Rees (1791–1821) - Welsh Quaker, businessman, author of the society's fifth tract (see SAS)
John Scott (1757–1832) - Evangelical, banker, author of the society's second tract (which had originally been published in 1796)
Frederick Smith (1757–1823) - Quaker, pharmacist and chemist
Thomas Sturge the Elder (1749–1825) - Quaker, businessman and philanthropist

Other notable members and associates

Chairmen/Presidents
Robert Marsden - Chairman, 1817–1836
Dr. John Lee - Barrister and astronomer; Chairman, ?-1843
Charles Hindley - Moravian, politician; President, 1843–1857
Samuel Morley - Radical politician and philanthropist; President, 1858-1860?
Joseph Pease - Quaker, politician; President, 1860–1872

Secretaries
Evan Rees - Secretary, ?–1821
Rev. Nun Morgan Harry - Secretary, ?–1830 (see Welsh Wikipedia)
Rev. John Jefferson - Congregational pastor; Secretary, 1840–1848
Rev. Henry Richard - Congregational pastor and politician; Secretary, 1848–1885
Rev. William Evans Darby - Secretary, 1885–1915
Rev. Herbert Dunnico – Secretary, 1915–?

Treasurers 
John Clarkson - Treasurer, 1816–1819
John Scott - Treasurer, 1820–1831
Samuel Gurney - Treasurer, 1832–?

Records of the Peace Society
International Peace Society Records, 1817–1948 at Swarthmore College, Pennsylvania.  Note: this is a large file of pamphlets and other printed publications of the Society. There is an historical introduction to the collection but no business archives are in the collection.
Other records of the Peace Society are reported to be in the possession of [Rev.] C.P. Dunnico

There are also records at the Savings Bank Museum, as the founder of the first parish savings bank Henry Duncan wrote on this subject.

See also 
 Christian pacifism
 Exeter Hall
 International Peace Congress
 List of anti-war organizations
 Peace congress
 World Anti-Slavery Convention
 American Peace Society, founded in 1828
 New York Peace Society, founded in 1815
 German Peace Society, founded in 1892

References

Further reading
Lewis Appleton, Memoirs of Henry Richard, the Apostle of Peace (Trubner & Co., 1889)
Peter Brock, Pacifism in Europe to 1914 (Princeton University Press, 1972)
Martin Ceadel, Pacifism in Britain, 1914-1945: The Defining of a Faith (Oxford University Press, 1980) 
Martin Ceadel, The Origins of War Prevention: The British Peace Movement and International Relations, 1730-1854 (Oxford University Press, 1996) 
 
Stephen Conway, The Politicization of the Nineteenth-Century Peace Society (Historical Research, vol. 66, issue 161), October 1993
Paul Laity, The British Peace Movement, 1870-1914 (Cambridge University Press, 2001) , some pages available at GoogleBooks – Chapter 1 concerns the first fifty years or so of the British Peace Society from 1816
Wilhelmus Hubertus van der Linden, The International Peace Movement, 1815–1874 (Tilleul Publications, 1987) 
The Times, Wednesday, 23 May 1866; p. 12; Issue 25505; col C: THE PEACE SOCIETY.-The 50th Anniversary

Peace organisations based in the United Kingdom
Organizations established in 1816
1816 establishments in the United Kingdom